The green bromeliad frog (Osteopilus wilderi), or Wilder's treefrog, is a species of frog in the family Hylidae endemic to Jamaica. Its natural habitats are closed-canopy forests where it occurs in terrestrial and arboreal bromeliads. It is threatened by habitat loss.

References

Osteopilus
Amphibians of Jamaica
Endemic fauna of Jamaica
Endangered fauna of North America
Taxonomy articles created by Polbot
Amphibians described in 1925